Project Moonbase (a.k.a. Project Moon Base) is a 1953 independently made black-and-white science fiction film, produced by Jack Seaman, directed by Richard Talmadge, and starring Ross Ford, Donna Martell, Hayden Rorke. It co-stars Larry Johns, Herb Jacobs, Barbara Morrison, and Ernestine Barrier. The film was distributed by Lippert Pictures and is based on a story by Robert A. Heinlein, who shares the screenwriting credit with producer Jack Seaman.

Project Moonbase is unusual for its time in both attempting to portray space travel in a "realistic" manner and for depicting a future in which women hold positions of authority and responsibility equal to men; as an example, the President of the United States is a woman.

Mystery Science Theater 3000 featured the film in January 1990 as an episode during its first season on The Comedy Channel. It had been originally broadcast in 1986 as a syndicated television episode of the Canned Film Festival.

Plot
In a future 1970, the United States is considering building bases on the Moon. Colonel Briteis (pronounced "Bright Eyes", whose first name is never stated, played by Donna Martell), Major Bill Moore (Ross Ford), and Doctor Wernher (Larry Johns) are sent to orbit the Moon to survey landing sites for future lunar missions. However, Wernher is an impostor whose mission is to destroy the US's Earth-orbiting space station, which he plans to do by colliding the rocket with the station on the way back from the Moon. Col. Briteis, who made the first orbital flight around the Earth four years earlier, is arrogant and distrusting of Major Moore. Moore, in turn had a romantic interest in Briteis when they began in the United States Space Force, but was rejected in favor of Briteis's ambition to be the first person on the Moon.

Moore realizes that the man claiming to be Wernher is actually a spy for an unnamed country, because the impostor has no knowledge of Wernher's expertise nor of the Brooklyn Dodgers, despite having supposedly taught in Brooklyn. In the ensuing struggle for control of the rocket, Colonel Briteis accidentally hits the boosters, which saves their lives but leaves the ship critically low on fuel. She takes unfair blame which Moore assures her is not her fault. Briteis then realizes she may not have all the answers and does need Moore's help on the mission. They are forced to make an emergency landing on the Moon, and with them all marooned the fake Wernher redeems himself by helping Moore establish communications with Earth, although an accident results in his untimely death.

In response to the unexpected turn of events, the US authorities decide to make the immobilized spaceship the core of a Moon base. Later General Greene has a man-to-man talk with Moore about his feelings for Briteis. Moore expresses doubts about her feelings for him, and says "she has no use for me." Briteis, after overhearing this, secretly proposes to Moore via Greene and cuts a deal with Madame President to promote Moore to brigadier general and in command of Project Moonbase to make up for her earlier actions towards him. Greene observes that Briteis and Moore will be isolated for weeks or perhaps months, and public opinion, the USSF and Madame President would want them to be husband and wife (in addition to general and colonel).

After a video wedding officiated by a USSF chaplain, and witnessed by Greene, Briteis pins a paper star on Moore, thereby indicating his new rank (presumably O-7, Brig. Gen.), one above hers (O-6, Col.). The couple then kisses, thereby signaling the beginning of their married life, and the end of the movie.

Cast
 Donna Martell as Colonel Briteis
 Hayden Rorke as Gen. 'Pappy' Greene
 Ross Ford as Maj. Bill Moore
 Larry Johns as Doctor Wernher
 Herb Jacobs as Mr. Roundtree
 Barbara Morrison as Polly Prattles
 Ernestine Barrier as Madame President
 James Craven as Commodore Carlson
 John Hedloe as Adjutant
 Peter Adams as Captain Carmody

Production and release
Both Project Moonbase and Cat-Women of the Moon (also 1953) were made using some of the same sets and costumes. The two films were released within one day of each other, though from different distributors.
 
Project Moonbase was shot in 10 days.

Mystery Science Theater 3000
Project Moonbase was featured in episode #109 of Mystery Science Theater 3000 along with Chapters 7 and 8 of Radar Men from the Moon, a Commando Cody serial. The episode debuted January 6, 1990, on the Comedy Channel. Kevin Murphy, who worked on the show and would become a cast member the next season, wrote, "The best thing I can say about it is that it was very very short," calling the film "openly and condescendingly hostile toward women as a gender".

As with most first-season episodes of Mystery Science Theater 3000, Project Moonbase is not considered one of the series' better efforts; it did not make their Top 100 list, as voted upon by MST3K Season 11 Kickstarter backers. Writer Jim Vogel ranked the episode #164 (out of 191 total MST3K episodes). Vogel said, "There's some glimmers of later-season MST3k goodness in there..."

The MST3K version of Project Moonbase was included as part of the Mystery Science Theater 3000 Volume XX DVD collection, released by Shout! Factory in March 2011. The other episodes in the four-disc set include Master Ninja I (episode #320), Master Ninja II (episode #324), and The Magic Voyage of Sinbad (episode #505).

See also
 List of films featuring space stations

References

External links
 
 
 
 
 
 Original soundtrack of Herschel Burke Gilbert’s score from Project Moonbase

Mystery Science Theater 3000
 

1953 films
1950s independent films
1950s science fiction adventure films
American black-and-white films
American independent films
American space adventure films
Cold War spy films
Films about astronauts
Films about the United States Space Force
Films based on works by Robert A. Heinlein
Films scored by Herschel Burke Gilbert
Films set in New Mexico
Films set in 1970
Films set in San Francisco
Films set in the future
Films with screenplays by Robert A. Heinlein
Hard science fiction films
Lippert Pictures films
Moon in film
1950s English-language films
1950s American films